Oscarre Vicich, first name also spelled Oscar (26 June 1922,  Rijeka, Free State of Fiume - 17 February 1994) is a retired Italian professional football player.

1922 births
1994 deaths
Italian footballers
HNK Rijeka players
Serie A players
Juventus F.C. players
U.C. Sampdoria players
Udinese Calcio players
Istrian Italian people
Footballers from Rijeka
Association football defenders